The Murder Game is an American horror film starring Steve Polites, Katie Sirk, Samuel Klein and directed by Robert Harari.  The film is distributed by Warner Bros. and Lightyear Entertainment.

Plot
A group of teenagers create a game where one of them is secretly a killer while the others are victims.  Using prop weapons, the killer must eliminate the other players before being discovered. The teens sneak into a warehouse late at night to play the game but things turn horrific when the players begin dying for real.

Awards
Best Feature, Terror Film Festival (2006)
Best Feature, Salem Independent Horror Film Festival (2006)

References

The New York Times Movies
http://www2.variety.com/cannes2009_listings.asp?company_id=43316
http://www.dvdresurrections.com/MovieReview_MurderGame.html
http://www.joblo.com/arrow/dvd_reviews.php?id=1355
http://www.horror-web.com/reviews/YaBB.cgi?board=Indie;action=display;num=1158698662;start=0#0
http://www.filmarcade.net/2008/04/indie-scene-murder-game-road-to-victory.html
http://www.fatally-yours.com/horror-reviews/the-murder-game
http://www.horrortalk.com/reviews/TheMurderGame/TheMurderGame.htm
https://web.archive.org/web/20130517055847/http://terrorfilmfestival.net/_wsn/page6.html
http://www.horrorsociety.com/2006/10/16/the-murder-game/

External links
 
 
 

2006 films
2000s English-language films
American horror films
2006 horror films
2000s American films